Mount Saint John, height , is located in the Teton Range, Grand Teton National Park, Wyoming, northwest of Jenny Lake. The mountain towers above the northwest shore of Jenny Lake, and along with Symmetry Spire and Rockchuck Peak, form a massif which looms to the north above Cascade Canyon. The scenic Lake of the Crags, a cirque lake or tarn, is located immediately south of the summit and is accessed by way of Hanging Canyon.

References

Saint John
Saint John
Saint John